Arthur T. Williams (September 29, 1939 – September 27, 2018), also known as Hambone Williams, was an American professional basketball player.

A 6'1" guard from California State Polytechnic University, Pomona, Williams played seven seasons (1967–1974) in the National Basketball Association as a member of the San Diego Rockets and Boston Celtics. Williams became the second player in NBA history to record a triple-double within his first four NBA games, joining Oscar Robertson.  He averaged 5.3 points per game in his career and won an NBA Championship with Boston in 1974. He received his nickname in junior high when someone called out, "hambone" and he turned around.

Williams also played briefly with the San Diego Conquistadors of the American Basketball Association in 1974–1975.

After suffering a stroke, Williams died on September 27, 2018 at the age of 78.

See also

 List of National Basketball Association players with most assists in a game

References

External links

 

1939 births
2018 deaths
American men's basketball players
Basketball players from Texas
Boston Celtics players
Cal Poly Pomona Broncos men's basketball players
People from Bonham, Texas
Point guards
San Diego Conquistadors players
San Diego Rockets players
Undrafted National Basketball Association players

San Diego High School alumni